Chuja may refer to:

 Chuja Islands, South Korean archipelago between Jeju and Wando
 Chunja, Rapti, village in Nepal

See also

 Chuya (disambiguation)